The 2019–20 season is Aldosivi's 2nd consecutive season in the top division of Argentine football. In addition to the Primera División, the club are competing in the Copa Argentina and Copa de la Superliga.

The season generally covers the period from 1 July 2019 to 30 June 2020.

Review

Pre-season
On 13 June 2019, Aldosivi announced the signing of Leandro Maciel, who would join officially in July on loan from Lanús. Days after, the signings of defenders Marcos Miers and Fernando Evangelista were revealed by the club. 14 June saw Jefferson Mena join Rionegro Águilas. Their first outgoing was publicised in the preceding May, with goalkeeper Matías Vega agreeing a move to Primera B Nacional's Deportivo Riestra. Estudiantes' Gastón Gil Romero was snapped up on loan on 24 June, while Manuel Capasso did the opposite as he was loaned out to Platense. Cain Fara, a centre-back from Ferro Carril Oeste, joined on 25 June. Luciano Perdomo became their third departure on 26 June to Chacarita Juniors. Jonatan Benedetti returned from loan on 30 June.

Players who were in on loan last campaign returned to their parent clubs on and around 30 June. Left-back Lucas Kruspzky signed for Santamarina on 1 July. Juan Galeano moved away from Aldosivi on 2 July, penning a contract with newly-promoted Primera División outfit Central Córdoba; Ismael Quílez did likewise on 4 July. A sixth new signing was confirmed on 2 July, as Nazareno Solís was loaned from Boca Juniors. Consecutive 2–2 draws were played out in friendlies with Temperley on 6 July. Cristian Chávez was sold on 8 July, with fellow Primera División team Independiente buying him. Sebastián Rincón came in on loan from Vitória Guimarães of the Primeira Liga on 10 July. Aldosivi met Ferro Carril Oeste in matches on 10 July, losing both times.

Also on 10 July, Matías Pisano agreed to head to Colombia with América de Cali. Federico Andrada was next through the door for Aldosivi, as the centre-forward penned terms from Unión Santa Fe. They suffered a 4–0 defeat away to Independiente on 13 July. Juan Silva was captured by Villa San Carlos on 15 July, while Hernán Burbano arrived from Atlas later that day. Dardo Miloc went off to Patronato on 16 July. Román Martínez joined from San Lorenzo on 18 July, as Lucas Villalba made his loan spell permanent. Jonatan Benedetti headed back out on loan on 18 July, linking with All Boys. Quilmes beat Aldosivi in two friendlies on 20 July. Francisco Grahl, a player most recently with San Martín, secured a permanent deal with Aldosivi on 22 July.

Facundo Bertoglio, coming from Greece's Lamia, penned a contract with Aldosivi on 23 July.

July
Aldosivi's Primera División season started with a loss away to Estudiantes, with Jonathan Schunke condemning them to defeat on 29 July. On 30 July, Denis Stracqualursi headed to Atlético de Rafaela. On the same day, Estudiantes revealed a loan deal had been agreed with Aldosivi for Nicolás Bazzana; medical dependant. 31 July saw Bazzana officially join.

August
Gonzalo Verón completed a loan move from Independiente on 1 August. Argentinos Juniors visited Aldosivi's Estadio José María Minella in the Primera División on 3 August, subsequently taking a point away following a goalless tie. Gonzalo Verón gave Aldosivi a friendly victory over Atlético Camioneros on 9 August, though it was followed by a 1–2 defeat to the same opponents hours later. On 16 August, Super League Greece 2 side Apollon Smyrnis communicated the signing of Javier Iritier. Aldosivi failed to win any of their first three league fixtures, after extending their streak on 18 August with a defeat at La Bombonera to Boca Juniors. Aldosivi got their opening three points on the board on 26 August, as they thrashed Atlético Tucumán by three goals at home in Mar del Plata.

September
Aldosivi lost away to Talleres in the Primera División on 1 September, despite Nazareno Solís putting them ahead within the first minute.

Squad

Transfers
Domestic transfer windows:3 July 2019 to 24 September 201920 January 2020 to 19 February 2020.

Transfers in

Transfers out

Loans in

Loans out

Friendlies

Pre-season
Primera B Nacional's Quilmes scheduled pre-season friendlies with Aldosivi on 20 June 2019, with the matches set for 20 July in Mar del Plata. Aldosivi announced a slate of three friendlies on 24 June, as fixtures were set against Temperley (6 July), Independiente (13 July) and an opponent to be named (17 July) - though the latter was cancelled. Ferro Carril Oeste set a game with Aldosivi on 1 July.

Mid-season
Two friendlies with Atlético Camioneros were scheduled for 9 August. Aldosivi would travel to face Defensa y Justicia on 7 September.

Competitions

Primera División

League table

Relegation table

Source: AFA

Results summary

Matches
The fixtures for the 2019–20 campaign were released on 10 July.

Copa Argentina

Copa de la Superliga

Squad statistics

Appearances and goals

Statistics accurate as of 2 September 2019.

Goalscorers

Notes

References

Aldosivi seasons
Aldosivi